George Charles Appleyard (31 May 1900 – after 1926) was an English football forward. He was born in Rawmarsh, Yorkshire.

Appleyard began his career with Rotherham Forge, subsequently playing for Rotherham Town and Rawmarsh Athletic before joining Barnsley where he made his league debut in the 1923–24 season. He joined Exeter City in 1924 before moving to local rivals Torquay United where he was a regular in their Southern League side in the 1925–26 season. He also played in all eight of Torquay's FA Cup games that season as they reached the first round and took Third Division Reading to a second replay.

He left at the end of the 1925–26 season to join Wrexham.

References

1900 births
Year of death missing
People from Rawmarsh
Footballers from Yorkshire
English footballers
Association football forwards
Rotherham Town F.C. (1899) players
Rawmarsh Welfare F.C. players
Barnsley F.C. players
Exeter City F.C. players
Torquay United F.C. players
Wrexham A.F.C. players
English Football League players